T. Warren Metzger was an American politician. He served as the 28th mayor of Lancaster, Pennsylvania from 1930 to 1934.

References

Mayors of Lancaster, Pennsylvania